The Fortune Battle of the Corporate Bands is an annual music competition for amateur company-sponsored bands in the United States, Europe and Australia.  Created in 2001, the contest's proceeds benefit the Rock and Roll Hall of Fame in Cleveland, Ohio, which also serves as the location for the final round of the competition.  The Fortune Battle of the Corporate Bands is presented through a partnership with Fortune magazine and the Hall of Fame, and is sponsored by the NAMM Foundation (National Association of Music Merchants), Gibson Guitars, Marshall Fridge and Fender Premium Audio.

The competition is sometimes billed as a "celebration of musicians with day jobs".  As of 2013, a requirement is that all participants must be employees of the submitting company.

Contest origin and purpose 
The Battle of the Corporate Bands was developed as a joint effort between Fortune magazine and the Rock and Roll Hall of Fame and Museum to enhance the museum's profile in the business community.  The two executives most responsible for its creation were Kip Meyer, director of integrated programs for Fortune and Fortune Small Business magazines, and Steve Dobo, director of sponsorships and promotions at the Rock and Roll Hall of Fame.

The competition serves multiple purposes.  First, it serves as a fundraiser for the museum's Educational Fund.  In the 2007 contest, each entrant submitted a $200 entry fee, and each finalist's company donated $7,300 to take part in the final round.  The museum also earns contributions from the competition's corporate sponsors and from ticket sales.

The contest also provides increased exposure to the companies which sponsor the bands, via the media attention generated by the contest, and via recaps of the contest that appear in Fortune.

Contest format 
The contest entry process begins early in the year, when bands submit a three-song CD to a panel of judges, typically due in late April.  During the first three years of the contest, this panel selected the eight national finalists.  For every year since then, the judging panel selects 18 US bands to participate in one of three qualifying US regional "Battles" which are held in the summer.  Locations for the US regional contests vary from year to year—the 2007 regionals were held in Nashville, Tennessee, Los Angeles, and Austin, Texas.  In 2008 a European regional was added for the first time, in London, UK.  Six bands from around Europe are selected for the European regional.

At each regional event, each of the six bands performs a 20-minute set.  The judges then choose two finalists from each US regional, plus the one winner of the European regional.  After all of the regionals have been completed, the judges choose an additional one or two bands as "wild card" finalists, typically making eight finalists in all.

In some years, a finalist is included from Australia.  Since 2004, Telstra, an Australian telecommunications and information services company, has sponsored their own national competition, called RockInc.  The winner of RockInc is automatically entitled to a spot in the Fortune competition final.

On the day of the finals, held at the Rock and Roll Hall of Fame in October, each band performs a 30-minute non-judged showcase for the public during the day.  That evening, each band plays a 15-minute set for a panel of music industry judges.  The judges will then select a winner, dubbed "The Best Corporate Band in America" for that year, along with 2nd and 3rd-place winners.

Contest awards
Members of the winning band receive an expenses-paid trip to the annual NAMM Show, where they will be a featured performer.  In 2007, Continental Airlines also awarded two airline tickets for each member of the winning band.  The band also has its name and photo displayed at the Rock Hall of Fame for one year as part of a permanent exhibit honoring the event.  The winning band also receives a "gold record" trophy, along with varsity jackets embroidered with their band's name and the contest logo. First-place bands are not allowed to enter the competition again.

Awards are also given to individuals for Best Guitarist, Best Bass Player, Best Keyboardist, Best Vocalist, Best Horn and Best Drummer.

Results

Trivia
 In the same year (2003) Fleet Capital Leasing's the Residuals won "Best Band" honors, lead vocalist Howard Merritt won a near-record amount on NBC's primetime game show The Weakest Link. 
 Just three weeks before his win for Best Horn in 2007, Grey's Matt Caporaletti was a champion on the TV game show Jeopardy!.

References

External links
 Fortune Battle of the Corporate Bands - official contest website
 "Fan's Choice Award" webpage on cnn.com - "Fan's Choice Award" website
 RockInc - Official website of the Australia competition

Music competitions in the United States
Rock and Roll Hall of Fame
Music competitions in Australia